Evgeny Mikhailovich Belyaev, also written as Yevgeny Belyayev (Russian: Евгений  Михайлович Беля́ев) (Klintsy, 11 September 1926 – 21/22 February 1994), was a Russian tenor soloist of the Alexandrov Ensemble under Boris Alexandrov. He is remembered in the  Soviet Union as the Russian Nightingale and in the West as one of the definitive singers of Kalinka.

Biography

Early years and private life 
On 11 September 1926, he was born in Klintsy in the Bryansk Oblast. As a child, he was known by the diminutive, Zhenia (the soft "g" of Bryansk). As a schoolboy he won a singing competition at the Artek (camp) (Young Pioneer camp) near the Black Sea.

During World War II he served in the subdivision of zenith troops and gained the Army Olympiad Prize. He fought in  Czechoslovakia and served as a Lance Corporal in the first Red Orders of Suvorov and Kutuzov division of the Carpathian Military District of the 4th Ukrainian Front under the command of General-Colonel Andrei Yeremenko. He is also said to have been in an anti-aircraft warfare unit and to have finished the war as a sergeant. He is said to have sung in the lulls between the fighting. (NB: The Suvorov and Kutuzov division later became the 93rd Mechanized Brigade (Ukraine)).

He then graduated from Gnessin State Musical College. He married and had two sons, one of whom was a professional pianist.

Musical career 

1947: He was a soloist of the Ensemble of Song and Dance of the Carpathian military district.

1952: He became a Member of the Communist Party of the Soviet Union (CPSU).

1955: He was a soloist of the Ensemble of Song and Dance of the Soviet Army of Alexandrov (Alexandrov Ensemble).
Under conductor Boris Alexandrov he recorded many songs, and performed all over the world: e.g. Europe, USA, Canada and Japan.  The Ensemble performed music by Soviet composers, and Russian and Ukrainian folk songs. Kalinka always drew special applause
 During his time as soloist with the Ensemble, Belyaev's singing teacher was Yevgeny Kanger, who only trained the leading soloists.

1958: Received the title: Honoured Artist of Russia (Meritorious Artist).

1960: Received the title: People's Artist of Russia.

1967: He was made People's Artist of the USSR.
1960s-1970s: When the ensemble visited London, Belyaev was described as the "Russian Nightingale" and "Mr Kalinka", and again "Monsieur Kalinka" in France.

1978: He won the State Prize of the USSR.

1980: He appears to have been associated in some way with Roskontsert (or Roskontserta), the big-band variety orchestra headed by the Russian jazz musician Oleg Lundstrem 
  
Also in this year he sang the voice-over part of the cartoon rabbit in the Russian film,Pif Paf Oi Oi Oi (Russian: Пиф Паф Ой Ой Ой) (possibly Dir. Garri Bardin, 1980). 
This animated cartoon dramatizes via opera a Russian nursery rhyme about a hunter shooting a rabbit ("Pif-paf!") which is brought home and found to be still alive ("Oi! Oi!"). Belyaev mainly performed in small chamber concerts in Russia after he left the Ensemble.

At some point he was made Honorary Citizen of Klintsy, his home town.

1994: In the 1990s he sang with the government musical organization RosKontsert as an independent soloist. On February 21 or 22, 1994 he died.  Belyaev attended Burdenko Military Hospital in Moscow with heart problems. He asked the doctors to let him go home for the weekend because there are usually no doctors during the weekend in hospitals, so they agreed. As soon as he arrived home on Kalininsky Prospekt (now Novy Arbat) in Moscow, he died straight away of a heart attack. He was buried in Moscow, not far from his fellow soloist Alexei Sergeev, in a section of Novodevichy Cemetery (Russian: Новоде́вичье кла́дбище) affiliated branch located in Kuntsevo District.

Critical commentary 

This commentary is about a music video featuring Evgeny Belyaev (see screenshot, right): Belyaev sings "Kalinka" on the music video "Soviet Army Chorus and Dance Ensemble". The first "Mr Kalinka" was Victor Nikitin who was the second tenor (Pyotr Tverdokhlebov was the first) to perform it with the dramatic, overarching and operatic notes which now precede the chorus in every Ensemble soloist's performance of this song. The origin of this kind of tenor-bravado introduction to a song is in Arab music, and can still be heard in Flamenco cante jondo. "Kalinka" is a trivial song about a fruit tree, but it lends itself perfectly to this kind of operatic showing-off.  Belyaev himself was already the recipient of popular acclaim after the 1956 London tour, and he had already been called "Mr Kalinka": the obvious natural successor to Nikitin. So in this performance, as the screenshot clearly shows, he is an immensely confident man with a great musical future before him.  In fact it was very possibly the Cold War which kept him tied to the Ensemble and away from the operatic career which he clearly deserved. Since Nikitin, "Kalinka" has always been one of the signature songs of the Ensemble, and the performances are always presented as both great achievement and great fun. This ca.1960 video is filmed outdoors, and shows the soldiers laughing, joshing each other, and dancing comically at the end.  This is acting of course, and a striking contrast to the severe picture of Soviet life which was being presented at that time in the West.  In the last moments of the "Kalinka" performance, Belyaev, like the other soldierly soloists not allowed to gesticulate while singing, cannot help himself and performs a brief Russian dance movement with his arms, showing us something we did not know before: that his background was in Russian dance culture as well as in music.

Notability

Worldwide fame 

This superb lyric tenor did not get the worldwide acclaim that he deserved during his lifetime; possibly because his prime occurred in the middle of the Cold War. Also his fame was subsumed within the fame of the Alexandrov Ensemble itself, when perhaps he would have gained greater personal fame had he pursued his natural course in the international opera circuit. However, it happens that he sang one of the definitive recorded versions of "Kalinka", and perhaps due to that, he is now becoming widely recognised and appreciated on websites such as YouTube. This is partly the result of "Kalinka" being recently associated with Chelsea Football Club.

Russian fame 

April 2007: In celebration of the 300th anniversary of the founding of Klintsy, Belyaev's home town, it was decided to install a bust of the singer by the sculptor A.Smirnov
in the town 
.

February 2008: A memorial concert was given in Bryansk in memory of Belyaev. It was attended by his great-niece Ekaterina Belaeva, fellow Communist Party members, people from his hometown Klintsy, and his old musical colleagues from the Alexandrov Ensemble. On this day the Klintsovskoy children's music school was named after Evgeny Belyaev.

Repertoire 

His work as soloist with the Alexandrov Ensemble meant that he sang primarily songs in the Russian folk music genre, traditional songs, and other songs about Russia, besides a few foreign songs and operatic arias.  For this he was considered a "national treasure".

What the songs are about 
In alphabetical order of titles, with links to auto-lyrics:

"Accidental Waltz": Probably a love song (lyrics unavailable).

"And Again I Am in Line": Song of the veteran pilots of World War II, and their replacement by younger pilots

"Baikal Beauty" recalls beautiful Lake Baikal and a girl at home for the homesick soldier.

"Before the Long Journey" remembers preparations for people's long journeys in the past; comparing them with the preparations of modern astronauts. Possibly sung as a tribute to Yuri Gagarin and his fellow astronauts.

"Bryanski Partisan Song": A guerilla song about Soviet partisans that mentions an ambush, burnt houses and revenge.

"By Mostochku Narrow": Possibly a veteran soldier's reminiscences (lyrics unavailable).

"Choir of Sailors from the Opera Dawn": (lyrics unavailable).

"Click the Guy": About soldiers, girls and Moscow (lyrics unavailable).

"The Cruiser Aurora": "What do you dream of, cruiser Aurora, in the hour when the morning comes on the Neva?"  The Aurora is a symbol of the Communist Revolution, and she has been a museum ship on the Neva at St. Petersburg since 1957.

"Donetski Night": refers to the horror of the Battle of Stalingrad, and optimism about a woman  (lyrics unavailable).

"Evening on the Road"/"Night on the Road": A sailors' song about going to sea.

"Far Far Away": About border guards far from home, protecting their homeland.

"Favourite Remember Us": Possibly about soldiers under orders, who know they will not come back (lyrics unavailable).

"Immortelle": Ballad about the death by the River Don of a heroic Cossack soldier, his body guarded by a single immortelle or everlasting Helichrysum flower, which according to the lyric does not bend with the wind.

"In a Sunny Forest Clearing": A soldier's love song.

"In the Dugouts"': A soldier in his dugout in the snow, sings to his accordion about his girl far away, and feels warm at the thought before he dies.

"Kalinka": A song about a snowball tree.

"Nightingales" ("Solovii"): The lyric of "Nightingales" asks the nightingale to be quiet as the soldiers are sleeping.  The song says that they need to sleep in preparation for the next battle, and there is an implication in the music that they may not come home. It is possible to interpret their next battle in relation to the afterlife, so the audience has the option to infer that they have died.

.

"Ogonek": Possibly about a girl and a soldier. It may refer to Ogonyok, (Russian: Огонёк), which means "little flame", as a symbol of love (lyrics unavailable).

"Oh You Rye": A love song (lyrics unavailable).

"Cold Waves Lapping": (lyrics unavailable).

"'Ridna My Mother": (lyrics unavailable).

"Rodina": About the Russian landscape.

"Russian Field"': The Russian landscape as Fatherland.

"Shooting Kommunarov": A war story to give encouragement to fight.

"Sing Soldiers": A hearty song for military morale.

"Song of Russia": The Russian landscape and Vladimir Lenin.

Two Maxim: a machine-gun song (lyrics unavailable).

"Where Are You Now, Friends": About soldiers returning from World War II.

Song arrangements 

Belyaev was a great lyric tenor, but it's Boris Alexandrov's musical arrangement (see Alexandrov Ensemble) which sets off his skill and creates the magic every time. A good example of this is the "Bryansky Partisan Song" with its Eastern Orthodox Church music tonality and harmony, which has the effect of somehow making the Ensemble sound like a choir of thousands, evoking perhaps the size of the USSR, the history which created its peoples, and pride in the Soviet partisans.  Belyaev sings the secondary harmony in a duet with Alexei T. Sergeev and the choir here, but his enthusiastic voice adds a piquant excitement to the sheer power of the arrangement.   So here is one possible answer to the question of why Belyaev stayed with the Ensemble instead of looking for easy fame on the opera circuit.  Musically, it was worth staying.

Recorded songs 

In date order of original recording dates (not album production dates).  Some original recordings have been recycled over many albums, and this is still happening - especially with some earlier recordings - due to their continuing popularity.

Key to links 
(a): from Japanese "Red Army" webpage, for images of past album sleeves containing tracks by Belyaev.
(b): from Amazon for current albums containing tracks by Belyaev.

1950s 
"Oh You Rye" (1950; 1964; 1978; 1992) (composer A. Doluhanyan; lyrics A. Newcomer 1950)
(a): 
(b):

"Choir of Sailors from the Opera Dawn" (1954)  (composer K. Molchanov; lyrics S. Severtsov): no data

"Cold Waves Lapping" (1954) (composer F. Bogoroditsky; lyrics Ya Repninsky): no data

"Kalinka"  (1956; 1963; 1978; 1992).
(a):
(b):

"Annie Laurie"  (1956; 1963).
(a):
(b):

"You Are Always Beautiful" (1956; 1963).
(a):

(b):

"Forever" (1956; 1963).
(a):

"Far Away" (1956) (composer G. Nosov; lyrics  A. Churkin 1950).
(b):

"Troika" (1959) (Traditional).
(a):

1960s 

"Ridna My Mother" (1960) (composer P. Maiboroda; lyrics A. Malyshko: no data

"By Mostochku Narrow" (1960) (composer K. Akimov; lyrics M. Vershinin): no data

"Beautiful Moonlit Night" (or "Moonlight") (1960; 1963).
(a):
(b):

"Sing Soldiers", or "That Soldier Sings" (1960) (composer A. Doluhanyan; lyrics Nekrasova L. 1955)
(a):

"I Will Be a Soldier Again" (1960s?).
(a):

"Where Are Your Arms" (1948–65; 1985).
(a):

"My Country I Pledge To You" (1963?).
(a):

"Nightingales" (1963; 1975; 1978) (composer V.Solovev-Sedoy; lyrics A. Fatyanov)
(a):
(b):

"Near the Garden" (1963).
(a):

"Before the Long Journey" (1964) (composer Matvey Blanter; lyrics Vladimir Dyhovichny 1962)
(a):

"Song of Russia" (1964) (composer D. Kabalevsky; lyrics A. Newcomer)
(a):

"Come My Way" (ca.1965).
(a):

"Where This Country Was Built" (1965).
(a):

"On a Hill" (1968).
(a):

"Gorondorina La"' (1968).
(a):

1970s 
"Russia" (ca.1970).
(a):

"Song of the Klintsah" (Oct 1971) (composer A. Kulygin, lyrics A. Annual 1971) broadcast in the USSR on All-Union Radio, to celebrate Belyaev's home town Klintsy He performed the song in concerts in the Bryansk region in 1975.

"Album:Русские Песни И Романсы"(1973) CM 03831-2.

"'Wilderness" (1974).
(a):

The Russian Field (1975) (composer J. Frenkel; lyrics I. Goff 1965)
(a):

In My Moscow Suburb (ca.1975?).
(a):

In the Dugouts (1975; 1977) (composer K. Sheets; lyrics A. Surkov 1942): no data

Accidental Waltz (1977) (composer M. Fradkin; lyrics E. Dolmatovskaya): no data

Ogonek (1977) (lyrics M.Isakovsky): no data

My Favourite (1977) (composer M. Blanter; lyrics E. Dolmatovskaya 1942): no data

Two Maxim (1977) (composer S. Katz;
lyrics M. Plyatskovsky 1941): no data

You Who Love (1978).
(a):

Catalina (1978).
(a):

1980s 

Evening on the Waterfront (1985).
(a):

Evening on the Road/Night on the Road (undated) (composer V. Solovyov-Sedoy; lyrics A. Churkin 1943). Duet with Boris G. Shapenko)

Execution of the Warrior Revolution (1987)
(a):

1990s 

In the Sunny Meadow/Shine in the Field (1992).
(a):
(b):

Black Eyebrows (1992).
(a):
(b):

Happy Girl (1992).
(a):
(b):

Birch Tree Stood in the Meadow (1992).
(a):
(b):

In the Forest (1992).
(a):
(b):

Wait For Your Soldier/Wait a Day to Return (1992).
(a):
(b):

Motherland/Country (1992).
(a):
(b):

Undated 

Lying (undated).
(a): no data

Take a Bandura (undated).
(a):

Our Friends (undated).
(a):

Hey Girl (undated).
(a):

Rough sea spray (cruiser "VARYAGU") (undated).
(a):

The Cruiser Aurora (undated) (music: V.Shainskiy; lyrics: M.Matusovskiy)

Soldier's Wife (undated).
(a):

Epitaph (undated).
(a):

In the Central Steppes (undated).
(b):

Baikal Beauty (undated) (composer A. Doluhanyan; lyrics M. Lisyansky): no data

Immortelle (undated) (composer S. Zaslavsky; lyrics A. Sofronov): no data

Donetski Night (undated) (composer E. Zharkovsky; lyrics N. Upenik, L. Titova 1975): no data

Where Are You Now, Friends (undated) (composer V. Solovyov-Sedoy; lyrics A. Fatyanov 1947): no data

And Again I am In Line (undated) (composer B. Muradeli; lyrics S. Bencken 1960): no data

Favourite, Remember Us (undated) (composer Boris Alexandrov; lyrics N. Dobronravov 1978): no data

In a Sunny Forest Clearing (undated) (composer V.P.Solovev-Sedoy; lyrics A. Fatyanov 1970): no data

Bryansky Partisan Song (undated) (composer D. Kabalevsky; lyrics V.Lebedev-Kumach). Duet with Alexei T. Sergeev: no data
.

Shooting Kommunarov (undated) (composer V.Tan-Bogoraz): no data

Rodina (undated)  (composer A. Samoylov; lyrics F. Savinov): no data

Click the Guy (undated) (composer LA Shats; lyrics V. Alferov 1977): no data

At the Gate, The Gate (undated) (traditional): no data

I Left the Army (undated) (composer S. Tulika; lyrics V. Malkov): no data

I Loved You (undated) (composer B.Sheremetyev; lyrics Pushkin): no data

I Met You (undated) (composer B.Sheremetyev; lyrics F.Tyutchev): no data

It Evokes Memories (undated) (composer P.Bulakhov): no data

I Took You into the Tundra (undated) (composer M. Fradkin; lyrics M. Plyatskovsky): no data.

Listen If You Want (undated) (composer N.Shiskin): no data

My Moscow (undated) (composer O. Feltsman; lyrics A. Sofronov): no data

Separation (undated) (composer A.Gurilev; lyrics A.Koltsov): no data

Soldiers' Mothers (undated) (composer Boris Alexandrov; lyrics S. Bencken): no data

Soldiers Pribautki (undated) (composer A. Doluhanyan; lyrics G. Hodos). Duet with B. Ruslanov: no data

Unselfish Soul (undated) (composer A. Pakhmutova; lyrics M. Lisyansky): no data

We Went Out Into the Garden (undated) (composer M.Tolstoy; lyrics A.Butt): no data

The Book Motherland (undated) (composer Boris Alexandrov; lyrics N. Dorizo): no data

Kid (Sucu Sucu) (undated, 1960s?) (composer Tarateño Rojas; translator unknown, Russian & Spanish)

To You I Swear the Fatherland (undated): no data

Discography 
His 78s, LPs, CDs and DVDs are listed on the Alexandrov Ensemble discography page.

See also 

 Alexandrov Ensemble
 Alexandrov Ensemble soloists
 Alexandrov Ensemble choir
 Alexandrov Ensemble discography
 Georgi Pavlovich Vinogradov

References

External links 
 Russian Wikipedia page on Evgeny Belyaev in Russian
  Literature about Belyaev in the russian press (Russian)
 Sci-lib page: Literature about Belyaev in Russian Press Russian-English
 Homepages of the Alexandrov ensemble (Russian)
 Japanese webpage detailing biography and discography of Belaev Japanese
 RUVR Broadcasting company (In English; with Alexandrov Ensemble and Belyaev mentioned halfway down page)
 1tvrus 1977 images of Belyaev (Russian-English)
 Sci-lib biography of Belyaev (Russian-English)
 Communist Party webpage on 2008 memorial service for Belyaev (Russian-English)
 Bryansk Guide webpage on Klintsy's 300th anniversary (Russian-English)
 Image of bust of Belyaev in his home town of Klintsy (Russian-English)
 Klintsy webpage 14th Feb 2007: Plans for bust of Belyaev in Klintsy (Russian-English)
 Images of A.Smirnov, sculptor of the bust of Belyaev in Klintsy (Russian-English)
Voce del leone webpage: Review of /EMI Classics CD: Red Army Ensemble
Red Data book of Russian pop music: Evgeny Belyaev (in Russian; short biography and songlist)
Youtube: Eveny Belyaev sings Motherland (1992), his last recording.

1926 births
1994 deaths
Burials at Kuntsevo Cemetery
People from Klintsy
People's Artists of the USSR
Soviet military personnel of World War II
Russian tenors
Soviet tenors
Recipients of the USSR State Prize
Alexandrov Ensemble
20th-century Russian singers
Burials in Troyekurovskoye Cemetery
Gnessin State Musical College alumni
20th-century Russian male singers